The 2009 PTT Thailand Open was a tennis tournament played on indoor hard courts. It was the 7th edition of the Thailand Open, and was part of the ATP World Tour 250 Series of the 2009 ATP World Tour. It was held at the Impact Arena in Bangkok, Thailand, from September 26 through October 4, 2009.

Entrants

Seeds

 Seeds are based on the rankings of September 21, 2009

Other entrants

The following players received wildcards into the singles main draw

  Danai Udomchoke
  Kittipong Wachiramanowong
  Somdev Devvarman

The following players received entry from the qualifying draw:

  Florian Mayer
  Marsel İlhan
  Marco Chiudinelli
  Édouard Roger-Vasselin

The following players received entry as a Lucky loser:

  Donald Young

Finals

Singles

 Gilles Simon defeated  Viktor Troicki, 7–5, 6–3.
 It was Simon's first title of the year and 6th of his career.

Doubles

 Eric Butorac /  Rajeev Ram defeated  Guillermo García-López /  Mischa Zverev, 7–6(7–4), 6–3.

External links
Official website

 
 ATP World Tour
Tennis, ATP World Tour, PTT Thailand Open
Tennis, ATP World Tour, PTT Thailand Open

Tennis, ATP World Tour, PTT Thailand Open
Tennis, ATP World Tour, PTT Thailand Open